Christmas in My Heart may refer to:
 Christmas in My Heart (Sarah Connor album), 2005 album by German pop singer Sarah Connor
 "Christmas in My Heart" (Sarah Connor song), 2005 single from Sarah Connor's album of the same name
 Christmas in My Heart (DVD), 2005 live DVD from Sarah Connor
 "Christmas in My Heart" (The Jets song), 1986 single from The Jets' album Christmas with The Jets
 Christmas in My Heart (Connie Francis album), 1959 album by American singer Connie Francis
 Christmas in My Heart (Gretchen Wilson album), 2013
 Christmas in My Heart (film), a 2021 Hallmark television film